Koryakino is a rural locality (a village) in Sizemskoye Rural Settlement, Sheksninsky District, Vologda Oblast, Russia. The population was 18 as of 2002.

Geography 
Koryakino is located 71 km northeast of Sheksna (the district's administrative centre) by road. Pavlovskoye is the nearest rural locality.

References 

Rural localities in Sheksninsky District